Laura Maria Caterina Bassi Veratti (29 October 1711 – 20 February 1778) was an Italian physicist and academic. Recognized and depicted as "Minerva" (goddess of wisdom), she was the first woman to have a doctorate in science, and the second woman in the world to earn the Doctor of Philosophy degree. Working at the University of Bologna, she was also the first salaried female teacher in a university. At one time the highest paid employee of the university, by the end of her life Bassi held two other professorships. She was also the first female member of any scientific establishment, when she was elected to the Academy of Sciences of the Institute of Bologna in 1732 at 21.

Bassi had no formal education and was privately tutored from age five until she was twenty. By then she was well versed in major disciplines including sciences and mathematics. Noticing her ability, Prospero Lambertini, the Archbishop of Bologna (later Pope Benedict XIV), became her patron. With Lambertini's arrangement she publicly defended forty-nine theses before professors of the University of Bologna on 17 April 1732, for which she was awarded a doctoral degree on 12 May. A month later, she was appointed by the university as its first female teacher, albeit with the restriction that she was not allowed to teach all-male classes. Lambertini, by then the Pope, helped her to receive permissions for private classes and experiments, which were granted by the university in 1740.

Bassi became the most important populariser of Newtonian mechanics in Italy. She was inducted by the Pope to the Benedettini (similar to modern Pontifical Academy of Sciences) as an additional member in 1745. She took up the Chair of Experimental Physics in 1776, the position she held until her death. She is interred at the Church of Corpus Domini, Bologna.

Life
Bassi was born in 1711 in Bologna, to a prosperous lawyer Giuseppe Bassi and his wife Maria Rosa Cesari. The exact date of her birth is given variously as 20 October, 29 October, 31 October, and 29 November. But the University of Bologna and scholarly works agree on 29 October.

Bassi was privately educated. Her cousin Father Lorenzo Stegani taught her Latin, French, and mathematics from age five. From the age of thirteen to twenty she was taught philosophy, metaphysics, logic, and natural philosophy by Gaetano Tacconi, the family physician and professor of medicine at the University of Bologna. She and Tacconi began to drift apart after Bassi discovered an interest in Newtonian science, despite Tacconi's preference for her to focus on the less controversial Cartesian teachings.

Bassi's education and intellect was noticed by Prospero Lorenzini Lambertini, who became the Archbishop of Bologna in 1731 (later Pope Benedict XIV). Lambertini became the official patron of Bassi. He arranged for a public debate between Bassi and four professors from the University of Bologna on 17 April 1732. (Gabriele Manfredi, Jacopo Bartolomeo Beccari and Francesco Maria Zanotti took part.) In 1732, Bassi, aged twenty, publicly defended her forty-nine theses on Philosophica Studia at the Sala degli Anziani of the Palazzo Pubblico. The University of Bologna awarded her a doctorate degree on 12 May. She became the first woman to receive a doctorate in science, and the second woman in the world to earn a philosophy doctorate after Elena Cornaro Piscopia in 1678, fifty-four years prior. She was by then popularly known as Bolognese Minerva. She became the first woman elected to the Academy of Sciences of the Institute of Bologna on 20 March 1732.

On 7 February 1738, Bassi married Giuseppe Veratti, a doctor of medicine and a fellow lecturer in anatomy at the University of Bologna. They shared a sophisticated working relationship; it is argued that through their marriage Bassi was inspired to begin studying experimental physics. The exact number of their children is not clear, as some reports say it is eight, while others say twelve. Baptismal records held only eight. Caterina (born 1739), Caterina (born 1742), and Flaminio (born 1751) died in infancy. But five survived infancy: Giovanni (1738–1800), who became a canon of San Petronio and professor of theology in the Collegio Montalto; Ciro (1744–1827); Caterina (1745–1768), who became a nun; Giacomo (1749–1818), who became a canon; and Paolo (1753–1831), who became a doctor and professor of experimental physics at the Institute of Science and the only one to produce heirs.

Career

University of Bologna 

On 27 June 1732, Bassi defended twelve additional theses at the Archiginnasio, the main building of the University of Bologna. This was a petition for a teaching position to the Senate of the university. Her theses covered a wide range of subjects such as chemistry, physics, hydraulics, mathematics, mechanics and techniques. On 29 October 1732, the Senate and the University of Bologna granted Bassi's candidature and was appointed professor of natural philosophy (modern equivalent of honorary position) in December. She became the first salaried woman lecturer in the world, thus beginning her academic career.

The first lecture she gave was titled "De aqua corpore naturali elemento aliorum corporum parte universi", which can roughly be translated from Latin as, "Water as a natural element of all other bodies". The University, however, still held that women were to lead private lives, so she was more restricted than male teachers from delivering public lectures. She then fought for teaching rights equal to those of men, but to no avail. From 1746 to 1777 she gave only one formal dissertation per year ranging in topic from the problem of gravity to electricity. It is reported that she gave at least thirty-one dissertations to the university. In 1739 her plea for normal teaching duty was supported by Lambertini and Flamino Scarselli, the secretary to the Bolognese ambassador at the papal court. She was again denied, but she was allowed to start private lessons and granted funds for experiments at her home in 1759. This allowed her to avoid the constraints of the university and to explore new ideas.

The Senate expected Bassi to attend various events because she was a symbol and political figure. The Carnival Anatomy, a public dissection with tickets open to anyone, was an event she was expected to attend because it was a central feature of public life at the university which attracted the attention of many foreigners and important community members. She began attending this event annually in 1734.

In 1772 Paolo Balbi, professor of experimental physics, died suddenly. Although Bassi's husband Verratti was Balbi's longtime assistant, Bassi believed she could fill the vacancy, and in 1776, at the age of 65, she was appointed to the Chair of Experimental Physics by the Bologna Institute of Sciences, with her husband as a teaching assistant. Two years later she died, having made science into a lifelong career and advanced the status of women in academic circles.

Experimental work 
After her marriage to Giuseppe Veratti, she was able to lecture from home on a regular basis. During the 1760s, Bassi and her husband worked together on experimental research in electricity. This attracted the talent of Abbé Nollet and others to Bologna to study electricity.

She was mainly interested in Newtonian physics and taught courses on the subject for 28 years. She was one of the key figures in introducing Newton's ideas of physics and natural philosophy to Italy. She also carried out experiments of her own in all aspects of physics. In order to teach Newtonian physics and Franklinian electricity, topics that were not part of the university curriculum, Bassi gave private lessons. In her lifetime, she was the author of 28 papers, the majority of these on physics and hydraulics, although she did not publish any books. Only four of her papers were printed.

Bassi faced financial constraints for her experiments, which she mentioned in a letter to Flaminio Scarselli on 16 July 1755, saying, "As for my physical experiments, and in view of the fact that the continual expense that arises requires some form of assistance if I am to advance and perfect them, I am almost in despair." But she and Domenico Galeazzi were at the time paid the highest salaries (1,200 lire) in the university.

Correspondence 
The defense of her degree, awarding ceremony, and first lecture in 1732 were significant as they took place in the Palazzo Pubblico, one of the most important government buildings in Bologna. These events were attended by "not only the university faculty and students, but also by principal political and religious figures of the city – the Papal legate and vice-legate, the Archbishop of Bologna, the Gonfaloniere, the Elders, senators and magistrates. Additionally, 'all the ladies of Bologna and all the nobility'."

One of her most important patrons was Cardinal Prospero Lambertini, who encouraged her scientific work. He continually supported the University of Bologna and intervened when other members of the institute tried to segregate Bassi from the rest of the professors.

In 1745, Lambertini (now Pope Benedict XIV) established an elite group of 25 scholars known as the Benedettini ("Benedictines", named after himself.) Bassi pressed hard to be appointed to this group, but there was a mixed reaction from the other academics. Ultimately, Benedict did appoint her as an additional member, the only woman in the group, but without voting rights as the men.

Only a limited number of her scientific works survive, but her scientific impact is evident through her many correspondents including Voltaire, Cesare Beccaria, Francesco Algarotti, Roger Boscovich, Charles Bonnet, Jean-Antoine Nollet, Paolo Frisi, Lazzaro Spallanzani and Alessandro Volta. Voltaire once wrote to her saying, "There is no Bassi in London, and I would be much happier to be added to your Academy of Bologna than that of the English, even though it has produced a Newton".

Francesco Algarotti who published  his Neutonianismo per le dame ("Newtonism for Ladies") in 1737 wrote several poems regarding her degree ceremonies.

Death 
Bassi died on 20 February 1778 at the age of 66. She had deteriorating health attributed to her many pregnancies and childbirth complications. The cause of her death was recorded as attacco di petto (an "attack in the chest", likely heart attack). Her funeral was held at the Church of Corpus Domini, Bologna, where silver laurels were put on her head and she was paid tribute by members of the Benedettina. She was interred in the church in Via Tagliapietre, in front of the tomb of her fellow scientist Luigi Galvani.

Honors and awards
A bronze medal was awarded to Bassi by painter Domenico Maria Fratta and engraver Antonio Lazzari, to celebrate her first series of classes titled "Pubblica Docente e Collegiata". The medal displayed Bassi's image on one side, and on the other, the phrase "Soli cui fas vidisse Minervam". The phrase can roughly be translated to, "Only you can see Minerva".

After her death, a marble statue was made in her memory and placed above the Nautical Room in the institute.

She was an elected member of many literary societies and carried on an extensive correspondence with the most eminent European men of letters. She had membership in Accademia delle Scienze dell'Instituto di Bologna (1732), Accademia dei Dissonanti di Modena (1732), Universitá degli Apastiti, Firenze (1732), Accademia degli Arcadi di Roma (1737), Accademia dei Fluttuanti di Finale di Modena (1745), Accademia degli Ipocondriaci di Reggio Emilia (1750), Accademia degli Ardenti di Bologna (1752), Accademia degli Agiati di Rovereto (1754), Accademia dell'Emonia di Busseto (1754), Accademia degli Erranti di Fermo (1755), Accademia degli amanti della Botenica di Cortona (1758), Accademia Fulginia di Foligno (1760 and 1761), Accademia dei Teopneusti di Correggio (1763), and Accademia dei Placidi di Recanati (1774).

She was well acquainted with classical literature, as well as with the literature of France and Italy.

Legacy 
A 31 km crater on Venus honours her name, along with a high school, and a city street, Via Laura Bassi Veratti, in Bologna.

The Editing Press offers a Laura Bassi Scholarship thrice in a year since 2018 to junior academics, master's and doctoral candidates.

An icebreaker research ship RRS Ernest Shackleton of the British Antarctic Survey was acquired by the Istituto Nazionale di Oceanografia e di Geofisica Sperimentale (National Institute of Oceanography and Experimental Geophysics) on 9 May 2019, and was renamed Laura Bassi.

On 17 April 2021, Google showed a Doodle celebrating Bassi and her many achievements.

Published works
Owing to her administrative duties, family problems and frequent diseases during childbirth, Bassi published only a few works, which reflect a small fraction of her contributions to the University of Bologna. Her scientific works were best summed up in Domenico Piani's treatise Catalogo dei Lavori dell'Antica Accademia, raccolti sotto i singoli autori, published in 1852. Her published works were:
 De acqua corpore naturali elemento aliorum corporum parte universi (Concerning bodies of water as natural elements of other parts of the universe, a collection of theses for university appointment, was published in 1732)
 Four works that appeared in De Bononiensi Scientiarum et Artium Instituto atque Academia Commentarii (Commentaries of the Bologna Institute and the Academy of Arts and Sciences), namely

 De aeris compressione (Concerning air pressure, 1745)
 De problemate quodam hydrometrico (Concerning certain problems in hydrometrics, 1757)
 De problemate quodam mechanico (Concerning certain problems in mechanics, 1757)
 De immixto fluidis aere (Concerning intermixed gaseous fluid, posthumously published in 1792)

See also
 Isaac Newton
 Luisa de Medrano
 Maria Gaetana Agnesi
 Maria Pellegrina Amoretti
 Maria Skłodowska-Curie
 Sophia Elisabet Brenner
 Timeline of women in science

References

Further reading
 
 
 
 
 
 Marta Cavazza, Laura Bassi, in A. Clericuzio e S. Ricci, (direttori), Il contributo italiano alla storia del pensiero, Appendice VIII della Enciclopedia Italiana di Scienze, Lettere ed Arti, vol. IV, Scienze, Roma, Istituto della Enciclopedia Italiana, 2013, pp. 376–379.6832987/view 
 Marta Cavazza, The Biographies of Laura Bassi, in Writing about Lives in Science:(Auto)Biography, Gender, and Genre, P. Govoni, Z.A. Franceschi, eds., V&Runipress GmbH, Goettingen, 2014, pp. 67–86.
 Paula Findlen, La Maestra di Bologna. Laura Bassi, una donna del Settecento in cattedra, in Eredi di Laura Bassi. Docenti e ricercatrici in Italia tra età moderna e presente, a cura di Marta Cavazza, Paola Govoni e Tiziana Pironi, Angeli, Milano, 2014, pp. 63–96.
 Marta Cavazza, Laura Bassi. Donne, genere e scienza nell'Italia del Settecento, Milano, Bibliografica, 2020.
 Paola Govoni, Laura Bassi, in Icone di scienza. Autobiografie e ritratti di naturalisti bolognesi della prima età moderna, a cura di M. Beretta, Bologna, Bononia University Press, pp. 131–35.

External links
 Profile with the Society for Catholic Scientists
 Biography of Laura Bassi at Project Continua
 Bassi-Veratti Collection at Stanford University
 Profile at Science Museum Group
 Laura Bassi: bibliographical and biographical references. – Center for the History of Women Philosophers and Scientists
 YouTube: Influential life of the 1st Female Professor: Laura Bassi

1711 births
1778 deaths
Scientists from Bologna
18th-century Italian women scientists
18th-century Italian physicists
Italian women physicists
Italian Roman Catholics
University of Bologna alumni
Academic staff of the University of Bologna
18th-century Latin-language writers
Latin-language writers from Italy